Villa Nueva is a town located in the General San Martín Department in the Province of Córdoba in central Argentina.

References

Populated places in Córdoba Province, Argentina
Populated places established in 1826
1826 establishments in Argentina